The 2017–18 NHL season was the 101st season of operation (100th season of play) of the National Hockey League. With the addition of a new expansion team, the Vegas Golden Knights, 31 teams competed in an 82-game regular season. The regular season began on October 4, 2017, and ended on April 8, 2018. The 2018 Stanley Cup playoffs began on April 11, 2018, and concluded on June 7, with the Washington Capitals winning their first Stanley Cup in the Finals over the Vegas Golden Knights in five games.

League business

Expansion
On June 22, 2016, the NHL confirmed that it had granted an expansion franchise in the city of Las Vegas to an ownership group led by Bill Foley, whose identity was revealed as the Vegas Golden Knights on November 22. The team plays in the Pacific Division of the Western Conference. In June 2017, the 2017 NHL Expansion Draft was held to fill out the Golden Knights roster.

Olympics abstention and ban
On April 3, 2017, the NHL announced that, after five Olympic tournaments in which the NHL allowed its players to participate in the event, it would not do so for the men's hockey tournament at the 2018 Winter Olympics in Pyeongchang, South Korea. Furthermore, the league did not include a break for the Olympics in its schedule, and scheduled its All-Star Game as usual for late-January shortly prior to the Olympics (historically, the All-Star Game was not played during Olympic years). Each team's mandatory bye week, stipulated in the league's CBA, was also scattered throughout the month of January.

The restriction will apply to any player under NHL contract, including those in its affiliated minor leagues, but not to players signed to one-way contracts directly with the teams in those minor leagues nor players signed to entry-level contracts who are playing junior ice hockey. Several players had vowed to participate anyway, most notably Alexander Ovechkin and Evgeni Malkin. They did not wind up participating. The league had initially stated that minor league prospects would not be subject to the ban. As the league had little legal room to enforce a ban itself without running afoul of the National Hockey League Players' Association, the league instead colluded with the International Ice Hockey Federation, who agreed to establish a blacklist forbidding the national teams from offering invitations to players under NHL contracts.

Players with Olympic aspirations who were free agents, especially those whose NHL prospects were marginal, were advised not to sign NHL contracts and, if they wished to play professionally, sign directly with minor league clubs to maintain Olympic eligibility. Former Buffalo Sabres captain Brian Gionta and former Olympian Jarome Iginla were among those who opted not to sign NHL contracts for the season prior to the Olympics; Iginla, because of a lingering injury, would not go to the Olympics.

Salary cap
On June 18, 2017, the National Hockey League Players' Association announced that the salary cap would be set at $75 million per team for the 2017–18 season.

Rule changes
The NHL Board of Governors passed some new rules that take effect this season, including:

 coach's challenge of offside - the original rule was put in place after a series of highly blatant off-side calls had been missed. The rule soon became a huge time waster, often requested by coaches whose team had allowed a goal wanting a review of the exact millimeter that a skate and the puck pass the blue line. To reduce the number of coach's challenges, there is now a two-minute penalty for delay of game if the review does not result in an offside being overturned.
 no timeouts after icing - as a team that causes an icing is not allowed to change the players on the ice, coaches took to calling their 30-second timeout to allow their players to rest, getting around the intent of the "no-changes" rule. This rule change eliminates that practice.
 touching high-sticked puck by power play team - previously, if a team on the man advantage played a puck after it was high-sticked, no matter where on the ice this happened, the play was stopped and the faceoff come all the way back to their own zone. This has been adjusted slightly so that, if the infraction happens in the short handed team's zone, the faceoff would only be moved back to the neutral zone just outside the short handed team's zone.

The Board of Governors has also stated that existing rules be fully enforced in certain situations that had become "unofficially" ignored:
 enforcement of slashing rules - not a rule change as such, referees are now expected to enforce the existing two-minute penalty for slashing when players chop at the wrists and hands of a puck carrier. This follows a series of injuries - including a partially chopped-off finger - for this common practice that was rarely being penalized.
 faceoff infractions - not a rule change as such, referees are now expected to enforce the existing two-minute penalty for improper stance by a player taking a faceoff. This follows an extensive period where players have not been standing with their feet properly placed within the limits of the markings by the dot, with their bodies square to the end boards.

Media rights
This was the seventh season under the NHL's ten-year U.S. rights deal with NBC Sports, and the fourth season of its twelve-year Canadian rights deals with Sportsnet and TVA Sports. On December 19, 2017, Rogers Media renewed its sub-licensing agreement with CBC Television for Hockey Night in Canada (which was to expire after this season) through the remainder of its tenure as national rightsholder.

Since CBC and NBC also hold the rights to air the Olympics in their respective countries, Rogers did not schedule any HNIC games on CBC during those Saturdays nights, only airing games on City and Sportsnet. NBC originally decided not to air any NHL games at all during the Olympics, but later reversed course, and added three Sunday afternoon telecasts during the Olympics.

AT&T SportsNet Rocky Mountain (which, along with AT&T SportsNet Pittsburgh, the regional broadcaster of the Pittsburgh Penguins, re-branded from Root Sports over the off-season) was the inaugural regional television rightsholder for the Vegas Golden Knights. TSN re-gained regional English-language rights to the Montreal Canadiens, and extended its radio contract for co-owned CKGM. Rogers Media acquired the radio rights to the Vancouver Canucks for newly acquired 650 CISL.

Centennial celebration
The NHL's centennial commemorations continued into the 2017–18 season, as its 100th season of play. On March 17, 2017, the NHL announced that it would hold an outdoor game at TD Place Stadium between the Ottawa Senators and Montreal Canadiens on December 16, 2017, to formally mark the 100th anniversary of their first NHL game.

The Toronto Maple Leafs marked the centennial of the NHL's first game (which involved their predecessor, the Toronto Arenas) with a "Next Century Game" on December 19, 2017 against the Carolina Hurricanes; the team wore special Toronto Arenas jerseys, and season ticket holders were encouraged to donate their tickets to the MLSE Foundation to allow students to attend this matinee game. Mayor of Toronto John Tory also declared December 19 "Toronto Maple Leafs Day".

Preseason games in China
On March 30, 2017, it was announced that the Los Angeles Kings and Vancouver Canucks would play two preseason games in China; on September 21 at Mercedes-Benz Arena in Shanghai and September 23 at the Beijing Wukesong Culture & Sports Center in Beijing. These were the first NHL games played in China.

Coaching changes

This was the first NHL season since the 1966–67 season in which no coaching changes took place during the regular season.

Arena changes
 The Detroit Red Wings moved to Little Caesars Arena, replacing their longtime home, the Joe Louis Arena.
 The Vegas Golden Knights played their inaugural season at T-Mobile Arena in Paradise, Nevada.
 The Washington Capitals' home arena was renamed from Verizon Center to Capital One Arena.
 The Winnipeg Jets' home arena was renamed from MTS Centre to Bell MTS Place in observance of the BCE Inc. acquisition of Manitoba Telecom Services (MTS) earlier in the year.

Regular season
The regular season began on October 4, 2017, and ended on April 8, 2018. Each team received a five-day "bye week", all of which took place in mid-January.

International games

Two regular season games between the Colorado Avalanche and the Ottawa Senators were played at Ericsson Globe in Stockholm, Sweden on November 10 and 11, 2017, branded as the SAP NHL Global Series.

Outdoor games
 The NHL 100 Classic was held on December 16, 2017, at TD Place Stadium in Lansdowne Park, Ottawa, featuring the Montreal Canadiens against the Ottawa Senators.
 The Winter Classic was held on January 1, 2018, at Citi Field in Flushing, New York, with the New York Rangers playing the Buffalo Sabres.
 A Stadium Series game was held on March 3, 2018, at Navy–Marine Corps Memorial Stadium in Annapolis, Maryland, featuring two of last season's playoff teams, the Toronto Maple Leafs and the Washington Capitals.

All–Star Game

The 63rd National Hockey League All-Star Game was held in Tampa, Florida at Amalie Arena, home of the Tampa Bay Lightning, on January 28, 2018. The format did not change, and followed the format used in two previous All-Star games.

Postponed game
The Florida Panthers – Boston Bruins game scheduled for January 4, 2018, at TD Garden in Boston, Massachusetts, was postponed due to the effects of the January 2018 nor'easter. The game was rescheduled for April 8, the day after the regular season was originally scheduled to end.

Standings

Tie Breakers:
1. Fewer number of games played.
2. Greater Regulation + OT Wins (ROW)
3. Greatest number of points earned in head-to-head play (If teams played an unequal # of head-to-head games, the result of the first game on the home ice of the team with the extra home game is discarded.)
4. Greater Goal differential

Playoffs

Bracket
In each round, teams competed in a best-of-seven series following a 2–2–1–1–1 format (scores in the bracket indicate the number of games won in each best-of-seven series). The team with home ice advantage played at home for games one and two (and games five and seven, if necessary), and the other team was at home for games three and four (and game six, if necessary). The top three teams in each division made the playoffs, along with two wild cards in each conference, for a total of eight teams from each conference.

In the First Round, the lower seeded wild card in the conference played against the division winner with the best record while the other wild card played against the other division winner, and both wild cards were de facto #4 seeds. The other series matched the second and third place teams from the divisions. In the first two rounds, home ice advantage was awarded to the team with the better seed. Thereafter, it was awarded to the team that had the better regular season record.

Legend
 A1, A2, A3 – The first, second, and third place teams from the Atlantic Division, respectively
 M1, M2, M3 – The first, second, and third place teams from the Metropolitan Division, respectively
 C1, C2, C3 – The first, second, and third place teams from the Central Division, respectively
 P1, P2, P3 – The first, second, and third place teams from the Pacific Division, respectively
 WC – Wild Card teams

Statistics

Scoring leaders
The following players led the league in regular season points at the conclusion of games played on April 7, 2018.

Leading goaltenders
The following goaltenders led the league in regular season goals against average at the conclusion of games played on April 8, 2018, while playing at least 1,800 minutes.

NHL awards

The league's awards were presented at the NHL Awards ceremony, that was held following the 2018 Stanley Cup playoffs on June 20 at the Las Vegas Hard Rock Hotel and Casino. Finalists for voted awards were announced during the playoffs and winners were presented at the award ceremony. Voting concluded immediately after the end of the regular season. The Presidents' Trophy, the Prince of Wales Trophy and Clarence S. Campbell Bowl are not presented at the awards ceremony. The Lester Patrick Trophy is announced during the summer and presented in the fall. For the first time, the Professional Hockey Writers' Association voted to release each voters' ballot to the public after the awards ceremony.

All-Star teams

Milestones

First games

The following is a list of notable players who played their first NHL game during the 2017–18 season, listed with their first team.

Last games

The following is a list of players of note who played their last NHL game in 2017–18, listed with their team:

Major milestones reached

 On October 18, 2017, Toronto Maple Leafs forward Patrick Marleau played his 1,500th NHL game, becoming the 18th player to do so.
On October 26, 2017, New York Rangers forward Rick Nash played his 1,000th NHL game, becoming the 314th player to reach the mark.
 On November 2, 2017, San Jose Sharks forward Joe Thornton scored his 1,400th career point, becoming the 20th player in league history to reach this milestone.
 On November 4, 2017, Anaheim Ducks forward Andrew Cogliano played his 800th consecutive game, becoming the 4th player in league history to reach this milestone.
 On November 15, 2017, Anaheim Ducks forward Antoine Vermette played his 1,000th NHL game, becoming the 315th player to reach the mark.
 On November 30, 2017, Vancouver Canucks forward Daniel Sedin became the 87th player in league history to score 1,000 points.
 On December 12, 2017, Carolina Hurricanes goaltender Cam Ward recorded his 300th win, becoming the 32nd goaltender to reach the mark.
 On December 13, 2017, Dallas Stars goaltender Kari Lehtonen recorded his 300th win, becoming the 33rd goaltender to reach the mark.
 On December 15, 2017, Los Angeles Kings forward Marian Gaborik played his 1,000th NHL game, becoming the 316th player to reach the mark.
 On December 18, 2017, Edmonton Oilers forward Ryan Strome scored the 10,000th goal in Oilers history.
 On December 19, 2017, Toronto Maple Leafs forward James van Riemsdyk scored the 20,000th goal in Maple Leafs history.
 On December 21, 2017, Dallas Stars head coach Ken Hitchcock became the 3rd coach in league history to reach 800th wins.
 On December 21, 2017, Los Angeles Kings forward Dustin Brown played his 1,000th NHL game, becoming the 317th player to reach the mark and the 30th to play 1,000 games with one franchise.
 On December 30, 2017, Detroit Red Wings forward Frans Nielsen recorded his 47th shootout goal, making him the all-time leader in shootout goals.
 On January 16, 2018 New York Rangers goaltender Henrik Lundqvist became the first goaltender to win 20 games in 13 consecutive NHL seasons.
 On January 17, 2018, Dallas Stars head coach Ken Hitchcock became the fourth coach in league history to coach 1,500 games.
 On January 30, 2018, Dallas Stars defenceman Dan Hamhuis played his 1,000th NHL game, becoming the 318th player to reach the mark.
 On February 2, 2018, Minnesota Wild defenceman Ryan Suter recorded his 400th assist.
 On February 9, 2018, NHL Linesman Ryan Galloway officiated his 1,000th NHL game.
 On February 17, 2018, Washington Capitals head coach Barry Trotz became the fifth coach in league history to coach 1,500 games.
 On February 22, 2018, Nashville Predators goaltender Pekka Rinne reached his 300th win, becoming the 34th goaltender to reach the mark.
 On March 1, 2018, Nashville Predators general manager David Poile won his 1,320th game as a general manager, surpassing Glen Sather for most career wins as a general manager.
 On March 12, 2018, Washington Capitals forward Alexander Ovechkin scored his 600th goal, became the 20th player in league history to reach the mark.
 On March 12, 2018, Vegas Golden Knights goaltender Marc-Andre Fleury recorded his 400th win, becoming the 13th goaltender to reach the mark.
 On March 21, 2018, Calgary Flames forward Matt Stajan played in his 1,000th NHL game, becoming the 319th player to reach the mark.
 On March 29, 2018, Chicago Blackhawks defenceman Brent Seabrook played his 1,000th NHL game, becoming the 320th player to reach the mark.
 On April 1, 2018, Washington Capitals forward Alexander Ovechkin played in his 1,000th NHL game, becoming the 321st player to reach the mark.
 On April 5, 2018, Florida Panthers goaltender Roberto Luongo played his 1,000 NHL game, becoming the 322nd player and 3rd goaltender to reach the mark.
 On April 18, 2018, Pittsburgh Penguins forward Sidney Crosby recorded his 173rd career playoff point, passing Mario Lemieux as the Penguins' all-time leading playoff scorer.

Uniforms

 Adidas became the official apparel provider of the NHL beginning with the 2017–18 season. New or otherwise refreshed jerseys for all teams were unveiled on June 20, 2017.
 The Ottawa Senators wore helmet stickers honouring former general manager Bryan Murray, who died in August 2017.
 All jerseys continued to have patches of the NHL's centennial emblem, located above or below the numbers on their right sleeves, for at least up to mid-December and the playing of the NHL 100 Classic.
 The Toronto Maple Leafs wore Toronto Arenas throwback jerseys during their game on December 19, 2017.
 The Buffalo Sabres introduced a new third jersey at the 2018 NHL Winter Classic, wearing the uniform for three additional games later in the season.

See also
2017–18 NHL transactions
2017–18 NHL suspensions and fines
List of 2017–18 NHL Three Star Awards
2017 in sports
2018 in sports

References

External links
2017–18 NHL season schedule

 
1
1